Vaughtia purpuroides is a species of sea snail, a marine gastropod mollusc in the family Muricidae, the murex snails or rock snails.

Description

Distribution
This marine species occurs off Cape of Good Hope, South Africa.

References

 Kilburn, R.N. & Rippey, E. (1982) Sea Shells of Southern Africa. Macmillan South Africa, Johannesburg, xi + 249 pp. 
 Houart R. (1995) Pterymarchia n. gen. and Vaughtia n. gen., two new muricid genera (Gastropoda: Muricidae: Muricinae and Ocenebrinae). Apex 10(4): 127–136
 Steyn, D.G. & Lussi, M. (1998) Marine Shells of South Africa. An Illustrated Collector's Guide to Beached Shells. Ekogilde Publishers, Hartebeespoort, South Africa, ii + 264 pp.
 Houart R., Kilburn R.N. & Marais A.P. (2010) Muricidae. pp. 176–270, in: Marais A.P. & Seccombe A.D. (eds), Identification guide to the seashells of South Africa. Volume 1. Groenkloof: Centre for Molluscan Studies. 376 pp.
  Lussi M. (2012) Description of three new species of Vaughtia from off the Eastern Cape, South Africa with a revision of the genus (Gastropoda: Prosobranchia: Muricidae) from Southern Madagascar. Malacologia Mostra Mondiale 76: 5-13

External links
 Reeve, L. A. (1845-1849). Monograph of the genus Murex. In: Conchologia Iconica: or, illustrations of the shells of molluscous animals, vol. 3, pls 1-37 and unpaginated text. L. Reeve & Co., London.

purpuroides
Gastropods described in 1845